Robert Schoonjans (5 September 1925 – 15 March 2011) was a Belgian steeplechase runner. He competed in the men's 3000 metres steeplechase at the 1952 Summer Olympics.

References

1925 births
2011 deaths
Athletes (track and field) at the 1952 Summer Olympics
Belgian male steeplechase runners
Olympic athletes of Belgium
Place of birth missing